Steven Larry Woodard (born May 15, 1975) is a former professional baseball pitcher. He played all or parts of seven seasons in Major League Baseball, from 1997 until 2003, for the Milwaukee Brewers, Cleveland Indians, Texas Rangers and Boston Red Sox. He batted left-handed and threw right-handed.

He broke into the majors by throwing eight shutout innings, striking out 12 and allowing only one walk and one hit against the Toronto Blue Jays. , his game score of 91 is the highest by any debutant pitcher in American League history. He ended up with a 3-3 record and an ERA of 5.15 in his rookie year.

In 2008, his last professional season, Woodard pitched in the Florida Marlins organization, for their Triple-A affiliate, the Albuquerque Isotopes.

See also
 List of Major League Baseball players named in the Mitchell Report

References

External links

Major League Baseball pitchers
Milwaukee Brewers players
Cleveland Indians players
Texas Rangers players
Boston Red Sox players
Arizona League Brewers players
Beloit Snappers players
Stockton Ports players
El Paso Diablos players
Tucson Toros players
Akron Aeros players
Buffalo Bisons (minor league) players
Scranton/Wilkes-Barre Red Barons players
Memphis Redbirds players
Pawtucket Red Sox players
Sacramento River Cats players
Albuquerque Isotopes players
Baseball players from Alabama
People from Hartselle, Alabama
1975 births
Living people